Siny van Iterson (5 October 1919 – 7 August 2018) was a Dutch children's writer, whose work was recognised with several awards, including Children's Book of the Year in 1968, a Gouden Griffel and a Hans Christian Andersen Award.

Biography 
Van Iterson was born on Curaçao on 5 October 1919 to Dutch parents. She moved to the Netherlands at the age of two, but returned to Curaçao in 1947. In 1958 she moved with her husband to Colombia. She wrote exclusively in the Dutch language, although several titles have been translated into Danish, German and English. She often collaborated with illustrator Jenny Dalenoord. Her first two novels were set in Curaçao, whilst others were set in different South American locations. Her final novel was published in 1982. She died on 7 August 2018 in The Hague. According to the scholar Ronald Jobe, van Iterson's novels showed a "contemporary view of rural Colombia" as well as providing "commentary on the poverty" found in the country.

Awards and recognition 

 The title De adjudant van de vrachtwagen (The Adjutant of the Truck) was awarded as Children's Book of the Year in 1968. In English translation the title changed to Pulga.
 In 1971 she received a Gouden Griffel for Het gouden suikerriet (The Golden Sugar Cane).
 In 1972 van Iterson was nominated for the Hans Christian Andersen Award.

Selected works 

 Schaduw over Chocamata (1953)
 In de ban van de duivelsklip (1954)
 De adjudant van de vrachtwagen (1967) 
 Het gouden suikerriet (1970)

References 

1919 births
2018 deaths
Dutch women children's writers
Curaçao women writers
Hans Christian Andersen Award for Writing winners